Paul Thomas Taylor (born 4 October 1987) is an English footballer who plays as a striker for Congleton Town.

He has previously played for Vauxhall Motors, Chester City, Montegnée, Anderlecht, Charleroi, Ipswich Town, Peterborough United, Rotherham United, Blackburn Rovers, Bradford City, Doncaster Rovers and Stevenage.

Career

Apprenticeship and Vauxhall Motors
Born in Liverpool, Taylor is a former youth player of both Liverpool & Everton who then moved onto Manchester City from 2005 to 2006. Taylor joined non–league side Vauxhall Motors in 2007 and scored 17 goals in the Conference North in 2007–08.

During the season, Chester City had a bid for the player rejected and Taylor spent time on trial with Nottingham Forest. After several weeks of talks in the summer of 2008, Taylor joined Chester on 1 July on a six-month loan deal with a view to a permanent signing. On 27 October 2008, he was released from his loan contract with Chester City, he moved back to Vauxhall Motors.

Chester City and controversy
Taylor made his Chester debut as a substitute in a 6–0 defeat at Dagenham & Redbridge on 9 August 2008, which was also his first Football League appearance. He went on to play nine league games (seven as substitute) and one cup match before the club announced his loan was being terminated on 24 October 2008. This followed a "third breach of club discipline". Due to Chester city not paying Paul Taylor full wages he was unable to travel to 3 away matches. Despite Chester not wanting his services, Vauxhall Motors insisted City were legally bound to pay for his transfer in January 2009.

On 31 October 2008, it was reported that Taylor had tested positive in a random drugs test when at Chester, after traces of cocaine were found in his sample. As a result, he faced a six-month playing ban, before joining Belgian fifth division Montegnée.

Belgium
On 16 December 2009, he signed for Anderlecht, but on 26 January 2010 was loaned to Charleroi.

Peterborough United
Taylor signed for Peterborough United on an 18-month deal on 28 February 2011. He scored his first goal in the 2–2 draw at Millwall on 17 August 2011. He went on to make his first start on 20 August against Ipswich Town and scored two goals in a 7–1 victory. On 26 November, he scored a volley in the 1–1 draw against Middlesbrough. On 17 December 2011, Peterborough faced Coventry City at home, and with 20 minutes remaining Taylor picked up the ball and played it into the path of Emile Sinclair who finished off the move nicely, the game finished 1–0 to the Posh. He then continued his fine form in 2012, helping Peterborough avoid relegation to secure another year in the Championship. In April 2012, Taylor rejected a four-year deal at London Road Stadium, a chance to become the highest paid player at the club, as a result he was put on the Summer transfer list as part of the club's new policy.

On 28 August 2012, Taylor, along with teammate George Boyd, were the subject of an undisclosed bid from fellow Championship side, Ipswich Town, which was accepted by the club. The following day, both players travelled to discuss personal terms and both also passed medicals. However, later that night the deals fell through as neither player could agree personal terms.

Ipswich Town
On 30 August 2012, Ipswich returned with a second undisclosed bid of an initial £1.5 million, this time for Taylor only, which was also accepted by Peterborough. Taylor agreed personal terms the same day. On 14 June 2013, Taylor pleaded guilty to a charge of assault occasioning actual bodily harm. In April 2014, Ipswich manager Mick McCarthy confirmed that Taylor had been placed on the transfer list along with out of favour Goalkeeper Scott Loach.

On 26 September 2013, Taylor rejoined former club Peterborough United on a short-term loan deal running until 2 November 2013, as a replacement for the injured Lee Tomlin and to help gain first team football after a season long injury in his debut season at Ipswich Town.

In August 2014, it was announced Taylor had joined Rotherham United on loan until January 2015.

Peterborough United
In July 2016 it was announced that Taylor Had rejoined Peterborough United on a 1-year deal. He scored his first goal in his third spell for Peterborough in a 3–2 EFL Cup win against AFC Wimbledon on 9 August 2016.

Bradford City
On 23 June 2017, Bradford City confirmed the signing of Taylor from Peterborough United. He arrived on a free transfer, with his contract at Peterborough having left them in the summer. He left the club for personal reasons in April 2018.

Doncaster Rovers
On 2 August 2018, Taylor joined Doncaster Rovers on a free transfer, signing a one-year deal. On 31 January 2019, Taylor had his contract terminated by mutual consent following 19 appearances, scoring one goal.

Sandbach United 
In January 2022, Taylor has joined North West Counties League Division 1 South Team Sandbach United.

Career statistics

References

External links

1987 births
Living people
Footballers from Liverpool
English footballers
Association football forwards
Manchester City F.C. players
Vauxhall Motors F.C. players
Chester City F.C. players
R.R.F.C. Montegnée players
R.S.C. Anderlecht players
R. Charleroi S.C. players
Peterborough United F.C. players
Ipswich Town F.C. players
Rotherham United F.C. players
Blackburn Rovers F.C. players
Bradford City A.F.C. players
Doncaster Rovers F.C. players
Stevenage F.C. players
Belgian Pro League players
English Football League players
Expatriate footballers in Belgium
English expatriate sportspeople in Belgium
North West Counties Football League players